

See also
LEN Champions League
European Cup, Euroleague and LEN Champions League records and statistics

References

External links 
 LEN Champions League

+
LEN Champions League
European